Shawn Mathis Wayans (born January 19, 1971) is an American actor, comedian, writer, and producer. Along with his brother Marlon Wayans, he wrote and starred in The WB's sitcom The Wayans Bros.(1995–1999) and in the comedy films Don't Be a Menace (1996), Scary Movie (2000), Scary Movie 2 (2001), White Chicks (2004), Little Man (2006), and Dance Flick (2009). He made his debut on In Living Color (1990–1993).

Early life
Wayans, the ninth of ten siblings, was born in New York City, New York, the son of Elvira Alethia (Green), a homemaker and social worker, and Howell Stouten Wayans, a supermarket manager. His family were once Jehovah's Witnesses. Wayans grew up in the Fulton Houses in the Manhattan neighborhood of Chelsea and is a 1989 graduate of the Bayard Rustin High School for the Humanities.

Career 
On Fox's In Living Color, he began as DJ SW-1 and later became a featured performer, working with brothers Dwayne, Keenen (the show's creator), Damon, Marlon and sister Kim.

Along with Marlon, Shawn Wayans created and starred in the sitcom The Wayans Bros. (The WB, 1995–99) and co wrote, co executive produced and starred in the feature Don't Be a Menace to South Central While Drinking Your Juice in the Hood (1996), in which Keenen also acted. Wayans guest starred on episodes of MacGyver and Hangin' with Mr. Cooper and provided the voice of Toof for the animated children's series Waynehead (based on brother Damon's real life childhood experiences).

After a supporting stint in the gang drama New Blood (1999) Wayans' film fortunes increased dramatically when he co-starred with his brother Marlon in a hit film directed by their older brother Keenen: Scary Movie (1999–2000), a comic satire (which he also co wrote) on the then-recent trend of horror films like Scream.

Wayans played the apparently closeted Ray Wilkins, a role he reprised for the similarly popular 2001 sequel Scary Movie 2. To date, Wayans has not had any involvement with subsequent sequels.

He kept the familial team intact when he and Marlon starred in the Keenen-directed comedy White Chicks (2004), playing a pair of FBI agents forced to masquerade as spoiled white blonde heiresses. Shawn also received a share of story and screenplay credit on the film. Wayans teamed up with Marlon and Keenen once again for the 2006 comedy Little Man, which Wayans acted in, co-wrote, and co-produced.

Filmography

Film

Television

References

External links

1971 births
American people of Malagasy descent
20th-century American male actors
21st-century American male actors
African-American male comedians
American male comedians
African-American male actors
African-American television producers
Television producers from New York City
American male film actors
Living people
Male actors from New York City
Shawn
American male television actors
American sketch comedians
American stand-up comedians
Comedians from New York City
20th-century American comedians
21st-century American comedians
Film producers from New York (state)
People from Chelsea, Manhattan
20th-century African-American people
21st-century African-American people